Hatpokhar is a village in Deoria district  in the state of Uttar Pradesh, India.

Demographics
 India census Hatpokhar had a population of 157. Males constitute 55% of the population and females 45%. This village falls under Dharaniya Gram Panchayat.

References
 

Villages in Deoria district